Muhib Ullah Khan is a Pakistani politician who was the Provincial Minister of Khyber Pakhtunkhwa for Agriculture, in office from 29 August 2018 till 18 January 2023. He had been a member of the  Provincial Assembly of Khyber Pakhtunkhwa from August 2018 till January 2023. Previously, he was a Member of the Provincial Assembly of Khyber Pakhtunkhwa from May 2013 to May 2018.

Early life and education
He was born on 20 December 1968 in Swat District Pakistan.

He received a degree of Bachelor of Arts  in 2016.

Political career

He was elected to the Provincial Assembly of Khyber Pakhtunkhwa as a candidate of Pakistan Tehreek-e-Insaf (PTI) from Constituency PK-83 (Swat-IV) in 2013 Pakistani general election. He received 10,995 votes and defeated a candidate of Pakistan Muslim League (N). In May 2014, he was inducted into the provincial Khyber Pakhtunkhwa cabinet of Chief Minister Pervez Khattak and was appointed as adviser to Chief Minister on Livestock, Fisheries and Cooperatives.

He was re-elected to the Provincial Assembly of Khyber Pakhtunkhwa as a candidate of PTI from Constituency PK-8 (Swat-VII) in 2018 Pakistani general election.

On 29 August 2018, he was inducted into the provincial Khyber Pakhtunkhwa cabinet of Chief Minister Mahmood Khan and was appointed as Provincial Minister of Khyber Pakhtunkhwa for Agriculture.

References

Living people
Khyber Pakhtunkhwa MPAs 2013–2018
1968 births
Pakistan Tehreek-e-Insaf MPAs (Khyber Pakhtunkhwa)